The Source established in 1993 in Trondheim, Norway, is a Norwegian jazz band known for  its many recordings and collaborations in musical fusion concepts. Their Christmas concerts are considered a tradition in Norway.

The band, a quartet was made up of Trygve Seim (saxophone), Øyvind Brække (trombone), Ingebrigt Håker Flaten (bass) and Per Oddvar Johansen (drums). In 1995, Finn Guttormsen replaced Flaten on bass. He was replaced by Mats Eilertsen in 2005. The band was nominated to Spellemannprisen in 2007 for its album The Source of Christmas Live.

Recordings

References

External links
The Source: of Christmas Official website

Norwegian jazz ensembles